Liroceratia is a genus of very small, somewhat amphibious land snails that have a gill and an operculum, semi-terrestrial gastropod mollusks or micromollusk  in the family Iravadiidae.

Species
Species within the genus Liroceratia include:
 Liroceratia sulcata (Boettger, 1893)
 Liroceratia truncata (Garrett, 1873)

References

  Ponder W. F. (1984) A review of the genera of the Iravadiidae (Gastropoda: Rissoacea) with an assessment of the relationships of the family. Malacologia 25(1): 21-71. page(s): 51-52

Iravadiidae